Lucas Dias Silva, commonly known as either Lucas Dias, or simply as Lucas (born July 6, 1995) is a Brazilian professional basketball player who currently plays for Franca of the Novo Basquete Brasil (NBB).

Professional career
Dias was named Jordan Brand Classic International MVP in 2012. On April 21, 2015, it was announced that he would enter the 2015 NBA draft. However, he withdrew from the draft before the draft withdrawal deadline.

Dias began his pro career with the Brazilian NBB League club E.C. Pinheiros. He was named the Brazilian League Revelation Player of the 2015–16 season. In 2016, he moved to the Brazilian club Paulistano. He has been named to the All-NBB Team two times, in 2019 and 2021.

National team career

Brazilian junior national team
Dias represented Brazil at the international level, with its junior national teams. With Brazil's junior national teams, he played at the following tournaments: the 2011 FIBA Americas Under-16 Championship, the 2011 FIBA South American Under-17 Championship, the 2012 FIBA Americas Under-18 Championship, where he won a silver medal, and the 2013 FIBA Under-19 World Championship.

Brazilian senior national team
Dias has been a member of the senior Brazilian national basketball team. With Brazil, he played at the 2017 FIBA AmeriCup.

NBB career statistics

Regular season

Playoffs

Personal
Lucas Dias grew up with Lucas Mariano, who has also played in the NBB.

References

External links
FIBA Archive Profile
FIBA Game Center Profile
NBADraft.net Profile
Draftexpress.com Profile
LatinBasket.com Profile
Brazilian League Profile 

1995 births
Living people
Brazilian men's basketball players
Club Athletico Paulistano basketball players
Esporte Clube Pinheiros basketball players
Franca Basquetebol Clube players
Power forwards (basketball)
Small forwards
Sportspeople from São Paulo (state)